Har Ki Pauri, meaning the feet of Lord Vishnu (Hari), is a ghat on the banks of the river Ganges and landmark of the Hindu holy city of Haridwar in the Indian state of Uttarakhand.

It is believed that it is the precise spot where the Ganges leaves the mountains and enters the plains. The ghat is on the west bank of Ganges canal through which the Ganges is diverted just to the north. Har Ki Pauri is also the area where thousands of pilgrims converge and the festivities commence during the Kumbha Mela, which takes place every twelve years, and the Ardh Kumbh Mela, which takes place every six years and the Punjabi festival of Vaisakhi, a harvest festival occurring every year in the month of April.

Literally, "Har" means "God", "Ki" means " 's " and "Pauri" means "steps". Lord Vishnu is believed to have visited the Brahmakund in Har Ki Pauri in the Vedic times.<ref>TheHaridwar The Imperial Gazetteer of India, 1909, v. 13, p. 52.</ref>

 History 

King Vikramaditya is said to have built it in 1st century BC in the memory of his brother, Bharthari who had come to meditate here on the bank of the Ganges. It is considered to be the spot where the drops of Amrit fell over from the sky, while being carried in a pitcher by the celestial bird, Garuda after the Samudra Manthan.
Every day, Har Ki Pauri ghat witnesses hundreds taking a dip in water of the Ganges. The place is considered very auspicious. Over the years the ghats have undergone major extension and renovation as the crowds increased in subsequent Kumbh Melas. Several temples have come up on the steps, most built in late 19th century.

The extension of the ghats took place in 1938 (done by Hargyan Singh Katara, a Zamindar from Agra in Uttar Pradesh), and then again in 1986. It's landmark clock tower was erected in 1938.

 Ganga Aarti 

Each evening at sunset, the priests of Har ki Pauri perform the –  – over an old tradition. Lights are set on the water to drift downstream. A large number of people gather on both banks of the ganga river to sing  praises. At that time the priests hold large Fire Bowls in their hands, rungs bells at the temples situated at the ghat and chants are chanted by the priests. People flick Diya (made of leaves and flowers) into the river Ganges as a symbol of hopes and wishes. However, on some special cases, like on the occurrence of eclipses, the time of the ''  is be altered accordingly.

Drying the Waters in the Ganga Canal
Every year generally on the night of Dussehra the waters in the Ganga Canal in Rishav Haridwar are partially dried to do the job of cleaning the riverbed and undertake the repairing of the ghats. The waters are generally restored on the night of Diwali. But the Ganga Aarti is held every day as usual. It is believed that Maa Ganga visits her paternal house on the day of Dussehra and returns on the day of Bhai Dooj or Bhai Phota.

References

Further reading

Haridwar
Tourism in Uttarakhand
Ghats of India
Buildings and structures in Haridwar